John Kuczynski (born October 16, 1973 in Bloomsburg, Pennsylvania) is a former American professional darts player. He currently resides in Zion Grove, Pennsylvania and used the nickname Johnny K for his matches.

Career

For five years running – 2002, 2003, 2004, 2005 and 2006 – he was ranked number one according to American Darts Organisation's (ADO) points standings.

He played at the 2005 BDO World Darts Championship, losing in the first round to former world champion Ted Hankey.

He was the ADO's 2006 National cricket champion. In 2005, he reached the last 32 at the Las Vegas Desert Classic and was a finalist at the Quebec Open and a member of the U.S. World Cup Team.

He played in the 2006 PDC World Darts Championship, whitewashing Lionel Sams in the first round without dropping a single leg. He then went on to beat Dutchman Jan van der Rassel in the second round before losing to Gary Welding in the last 16. Kuczynski had won the first set and could have taken the second before Welding leveled. The American went back in front to lead 2–1, but Welding fought back to take the next three sets and a quarter final place to end Kuczynski's run.

At the 2006 World Series of Darts where the prize for an American winner was $1 million, he was the only American player who managed to progress beyond the opening round. He defeated John Part in the first round but went out in the second round to Wayne Mardle.

He reached the third round of the 2008 US Open, beating Vincent van der Voort and Canadian Daniel Beauregard in the first two rounds before losing to Ben Burton. The next day he reached the quarter-finals of the North American Darts Championship. Kuczynski then suffered a disappointing exit from the 2008 UK Open, losing in the preliminary round to pub qualifier Johnny Haines.

World Championship Results

BDO

 2005: 1st Round (lost to Ted Hankey 1–3)

PDC

 2006: 3rd Round (lost to Gary Welding 2–4)
 2007: 1st Round (lost to Mark Dudbridge 1–3)

External links
John Kuczynski's official web site
Stats at Darts Database

1973 births
American darts players
Sportspeople from Pennsylvania
Living people
British Darts Organisation players
Professional Darts Corporation former pro tour players